Sisan may refer to:
Šišan, Croatia
Sisan, Iran